Old Town was a Chickasaw village in northeast Mississippi in present-day Lee County.

See also
Town Creek
Chickasaw Campaign of 1736

References
. Retrieved 21 May 2008.

Chickasaw
Former Native American populated places in the United States
Geography of Lee County, Mississippi